Waiting for a Visa is a 20-page autobiographical life story of B. R. Ambedkar written in the period of 1935–36. It consists of reminiscences drawn by Ambedkar, related to his experiences with untouchability, in his own handwriting. The book is used as a textbook in Columbia University.

Contents
The book consists of a very brief introductory passage followed by six sections; relating Ambedkar's experiences with untouchability, starting from his childhood.
Sections 1,2,3 and 4 consist of Ambedkar's own experiences, while Sections 5 and 6 consist of other people's experiences with untouchability.

Brief introduction
In a short one paragraph introduction, Ambedkar introduces the theme of his book, especially for the benefit of foreigners and those who may not be familiar with the concept of untouchability.

Section 1: A childhood journey to Goregaon becomes a nightmare
The first section describes a journey undertaken in 1901 by the ten-year-old Ambedkar and his siblings, from their residence in Satara to Goregoan, to meet their father, and the discriminatory behaviour they experience en route at Masur which makes their very journey appear impossible and dangerous. Ambedkar recalls discrimination he faced in school. He remembers having to wait for school peon to enable him drinking water. He describes the situation as "no peon, no water".

Section 2: Back from the west, and unable to find lodging in Baroda

This sections describes the deep divides that existed in Baroda during that time, not just between castes, but also between religions. In 1918, upon returning to India (after 3 years in USA and a year in London), Ambedkar went to Baroda state to work as a probationer in the Accountant General's Office. However, upon arriving in Baroda, he realized that none of the Hindu hotels would allow his to stay due to his lower caste. He found a Parsi inn, but here, non-Parsis were not allowed to stay. He and the Parsi inn-keeper reached a compromise, where by Ambedkar gave his name as a Parsi, and was allowed to stay. However, this fraud (his words) was discovered by other Parsis, and on the eleventh day of his stay, a group of angry Parsi men, armed with sticks, arrived to remove him from the inn.
He had to leave the inn that very day, and not having a place to stay, was forced to leave Baroda and return to Bombay to find work elsewhere. Ambedkar recalls "It was then for the first time that I learnt that a person who is an untouchable to a Hindu is also an untouchable to a Parsi."

Section 3: Pride, awkwardness and a dangerous accident in Chalisgaon

In this section, Ambedkar recounts an embarrassing accident that occurred to him in the village of Chalisgaon (Maharashtra) in 1929. He had been appointed as a member to a committee  instituted by the Bombay government, to investigate allegations of oppression and grievances of untouchables. After carrying out investigations in the district of Khandesh, en route to Bombay, he disembarked at Chalisgaon to investigate a case of social boycott by Hindus against untouchables of that village.
The untouchables of the village requested him to spend the night with them, but as the tonga walas considered it below their dignity to cart an untouchable (Ambedkar), the villagers had to hire a tonga (horse-driven carriage) and ride it on their own. They did so, however the untouchable riding the carriage was a novice, and had an accident as they were crossing the river on a culvert. Ambedkar was thrown off the carriage as a wheel got stuck between the stones of the culvert. This resulted in multiple injuries to Ambedkar and a fracture. The horse and carriage fell into the river.

Ambedkar feels that the pride and dignity of the village untouchables (they did not want their visitor to have to walk to the village) made them take undue risks with the safety of their visitor. He also realized that even lowly menial tongawalas felt that a highly educated barrister at law untouchable was below them.

Section 4: Polluting the water in the fort of Daulatabad

This section relates to an incident in 1934 and showed Ambedkar how Muslims also treated untouchables as lower caste.

Ambedkar and a group of his friends had gone to visit Daulatabad fort, during a trip to Aurangabad (then in the Nizam state of Hyderabad). On arriving at the fort, Ambedkar's group washed themselves with water kept in a tank at the fort entrance. However, after a few minutes, an old Mohammedan started to run after them, shouting "the Dheds (untouchables) have polluted our water" and soon there was a commotion, with a large group of Muslims shooting at Ambedkar's group and at the local untouchable community.

Ambedkar recalls ''I gave one instance to show that a person who is an untouchable to a Hindu is also an untouchable to a Parsi. This will show that a person who is an untouchable to a Hindu is also an untouchable to a Mohammedan.''

Section 5: A doctor refuses to give proper care and a woman dies.

This section consists of a letter which was published in Young India, a journal published by M.K.Gandhi in its issue of 12 December 1929. It recounts the sad experience of a harijan in Kathiawar, whose wife fell sick soon after giving birth to a child. The Hindu (Brahmin) doctor refused to treat her directly, or see them in the house. The doctor finally agreed to see the sick lady if she were brought outside the harijan colony, and treated here without touching her, by passing the thermometer indirectly through a Muslim. Some medicine was given to her, and when her condition aggravated, the doctor refused to see her. 
She died  subsequently.

Section 6: A young clerk is abused and threatened until he gives up his job

This section recounts the narrated experience of a Bhangi boy, recounted on 6 March 1938 at a Bhangi meeting in Dadar, Bombay. The educated boy got employment as a Talati in the government district offices of  Borsad, Kheda, in what is now Gujarat. However, he was refused accommodation there, being an untouchable. Neither did the untouchables of the village accommodate him, fearing the wrath of Hindus who felt that the bhangi boy was aiming for a job which was beyond him.

At the government office, his colleagues discriminated against him, treated him badly and did not allow him to drink water when thirsty for fear of the water getting polluted by his touch.
Ultimately, matters only got worse, with a large crowd of locals threatening to kill him.
He left this job and returned home.

First publication and later editions

In 1990, the People's Education Society published this work as a booklet. It was subsequently published by the Education Department, Government of Maharashtra, in 1993 along with some collections in Dr. Babasaheb Ambedkar: Writings and Speeches, Vol. 12,  Part I.

See also 
 B. R. Ambedkar bibliography

References

Books by B. R. Ambedkar
Dalit literature
Autobiographies
1990 non-fiction books